Uppå källarbacken is a Swedish folk song, which is used when dancing around the Christmas tree as well as the Midsummerpole.

Publication
Julens önskesångbok, 1997, under the lines "Tjugondag Knut dansar julen ut", credited as "folksong"

Recordings
An early recording was done by Lily Berglund with Simon Brehm's band on 3 April 1954, released on a record later in April the same year.

References

Swedish folk songs
Lily Berglund songs
Year of song unknown
Songwriter unknown